The Gibson ES-295 (1952-1959) is a hollow body guitar which was built by the Gibson Guitar Company. The ES-295 was introduced in May 1952 as a fancier version of the ES-175. The 295 had the same measurements as the ES-175, but it came in Gold finish and featured a combination trapeze bridge/tailpiece.

History
In 1952 Les Paul has claimed responsibility for the creation of the ES-295. He is said to have called Gibson and told them to paint an ES-175 gold for a young man Paul met at a hospital. The first ES-295s came outfitted with one pickup. By 1953 the guitar was shipping with two pickups. It was designed to be a full-sized hollowbody archtop which would sell alongside the solidbody Les Paul model. The original price of the 295 was $295. The guitar was discontinued in 1959.

In 1990 Gibson reissued the ES-295 but it was again discontinued. In 1999 Gibson again produced the ES-295, this time in a Scotty Moore signature model. In 2013 Gibson also released a reissue '52 ES-295 but discontinued it again.

Specifications
ES-295s came with the same wrap around trapeze tailpiece that was standard on the first Les Paul Guitars. the whole guitar including the neck were finished in gold with ivory binding and pick-guard. The guitar had two single coil P-90s with cream colored pickup covers. The guitar had a 3 way switch with two tone knobs and two volume knobs. The metal parts were all finished in gold.

Reception
The 295 did not sell well. By 1957 Gibson changed the pickups from P-90s to Humbuckers. Some thought the gold color was a reason for the diminished interest in the 295. Gibson shipped some ES-295s in sunburst, Argentine Grey and cherry. The guitar was played by Elvis Presley guitarist Scotty Moore.

Notable players
Joe Bonamassa
Danny Gatton
Scotty Moore
Geordie Walker
Bryan Adams

References

ES-295
Semi-acoustic guitars
1958 musical instruments
1952 in music
Discontinued products